Baseball at the 1955 Pan American Games was contested between teams representing the Dominican Republic, Mexico, Netherlands Antilles, United States, and Venezuela. The 1955 edition was the second Pan American Games, and was hosted by Mexico City.

Medal summary

Medal table

Medalists

References

  .
 

1955
Events at the 1955 Pan American Games
Pan American Games
1955 Pan American Games